Marcus Henderson (born September 13, 1987) is an American actor best known for his roles as Walter in the film Get Out & Sgt. Andre Wright in Snowfall.

Early life 
Henderson was born in St. Louis to Leon and Barbara Henderson. He has one brother, Leon Henderson Jr. He attended college at Alabama State University on a football scholarship and was a member of Phi Beta Sigma. While there, he saw a one-man show performed by Charles S. Dutton, which led to his first professional role as an uncredited extra in the film Honeydripper. Dutton wrote Henderson a letter of recommendation to Yale School of Drama, where Henderson graduated in 2011.

Career 
Henderson describes himself as an actor, poet, chess and ukulele enthusiast and has said theater is "his first love". He has performed Shakespeare both at Yale and on the California Shakespeare Company. Henderson's first role in a major motion picture was as the character Big Sid in Django Unchained. In 2016, he portrayed one of the henchmen in Pete's Dragon. In 2017, he had a supporting role in the film Get Out & a recurring role in Snowfall (TV series). In 2019, Henderson appeared in Juanita, based on the novel Dancing on the Edge of the Roof by Sheila Williams and is a part of the main cast of Tacoma FD.

Personal life 
Henderson is married, has two daughters, and lives in Los Angeles.

Filmography

References

External links 
 

21st-century American male actors
African-American male actors
1987 births
Male actors from St. Louis
Living people
21st-century African-American people
20th-century African-American people